"My Body" is a song by R&B group LSG released as the first single from their debut album Levert.Sweat.Gill.

It is the group's most successful song, spending seven weeks at number-one on the US R&B chart. It also reached number four on the Billboard Hot 100 in late 1997 for three weeks. It was one of the songs that was blocked from three songs in the top three, "How Do I Live" by LeAnn Rimes, Usher's "You Make Me Wanna...", and Elton John's smash "Candle in the Wind 1997". It was produced by Darrell "Delite" Allamby and written by Darrell "Delite" Allamby, Antionette Roberson, and Link.

The remix version of the song features Missy Elliott.

Fellow former group member Keith Sweat sings the song as a tribute to member Gerald LeVert appears on the live DVD, The Sweat Hotel, and appeared on The Mo'Nique Show, who performs a medley as the closing of the show in October 2010 as also part of the tribute to him during the closing credits.

Late R&B singer Static Major sampled the chorus on his song "Infatuated".

Charts

Weekly charts

Year-end charts

Certifications

|}

See also
R&B number-one hits of 1997 (USA)
R&B number-one hits of 1998 (USA)

References

1997 songs
1997 debut singles
Music videos directed by Francis Lawrence
East West Records singles
Elektra Records singles
LSG (band) songs
Songs written by Darrell "Delite" Allamby